Jefferson County Airport may refer to:

 Jefferson County International Airport in Jefferson County, Washington, United States (FAA: 0S9)
 Jefferson County Airpark in Jefferson County, Ohio, United States (FAA: 2G2)
 DuBois Regional Airport, formerly DuBois-Jefferson County Airport, in Pennsylvania, United States (FAA: DUJ)
 Rocky Mountain Metropolitan Airport, formerly Jefferson County Airport, in Colorado, United States (FAA: BJC)
 Southeast Texas Regional Airport, formerly Jefferson County Airport, in Texas, United States (FAA: BPT)